Louis-Joseph Faure (5 March 1760 – 12 June 1837) was a French jurist and politician who was one of the four authors of the Napoleonic Code.

He was born in Le Havre and became a judge in Paris in 1791.  On 18 February 1792 he was elected as assistant to Maximilien Robespierre, the "public accuser" of the Tribunal criminel. He was a deputy prosecutor of the Seine, and then a member of the Council of Five Hundred and later the Tribunat.  He became a member of the Conseil d'État in 1807.  He submitted a report on the Code de procédure in 1806 and one on the Code pénal in 1810.

References

Dictionnaire Bouillet

First French Empire
19th-century French judges
20th-century French judges
People of the French Revolution
1760 births
1837 deaths